Richard McKinney may refer to:

Richard McKinney (footballer) (born 1979), Northern Ireland football goalkeeper 
Richard McKinney (archer) (born 1953), American Olympic archer

See also
Rich McKinney (born 1946), former Major League Baseball player